Scopula szechuanensis is a moth of the  family Geometridae. It is found in central China (Sichuan).

References

Moths described in 1913
szechuanensis
Moths of Asia